Captain Hurricane is a 1935 American drama film about the life of fishermen in Cape Cod.

Plot

Cast
 James Barton as Capt. Zenas Henry Brewster
 Helen Westley as Abbie Howland
 Helen Mack as Susan 'Matley' Ann
 Gene Lockhart as Capt. Jeremiah Taylor
 Henry Travers as Capt. Ben
 Douglas Walton as Jimmy Howell
 Otto Hoffman as Silas Coffin

Box office
The film lost $126,000 at the box office.

References

External links
Captain Hurricane at IMDb

1935 comedy-drama films
1935 films
American comedy-drama films
American black-and-white films
1930s American films